Mahalo Air was an airline that provided inter-island service within the state of Hawaii between 1993 and 1997.  The airline started service on October 4, 1993, using Fokker F27 turboprop aircraft operated by Empire Airlines while awaiting its own certification.  On May 31, 1994, the agreement with Empire ran out, shutting down the airline.  In October of that year, the airline resumed operations with its own certificate, using new ATR-42 turboprops.  During the summer of 1997, the airline filed for Chapter 11 bankruptcy protection, and ceased operations on September 2. The airline was headquartered in Honolulu.

Destinations 
Honolulu (Honolulu International Airport) 
Kahului (Kahului Airport) 
Kapalua (Kapalua Airport)
Kaunakakai (Molokai Airport)
Kona (Kona International Airport)
Lihue (Lihue Airport)

Fleet

See also 
 List of defunct airlines of the United States

References

External links

 Mahalo Air (Archive)

Defunct airlines of the United States
Airlines established in 1993
Airlines disestablished in 1997
Defunct companies based in Hawaii
Transportation in Honolulu